Jhumka may refer to:

Jhumka, a city in the Sunsari District
Jhumka (earring style), an earring style in the Indian Subcontinent
Jhumka Dam, a dam in the Chandaka Elephant Sanctuary